Dorit Shavit (Hebrew: דורית שביט; born March 13, 1949 Jerusalem) was the first woman to be the Israeli Ambassador to Argentina, from 2011 until 2016.

From 1994 to 1999, she was Consul General in São Paulo.

She never intended to work for the Foreign Ministry, having studied Islamic Studies at Hebrew University. However, after the Yom Kippur War, and recommendations made by the Agranat Commission, "she was recruited for her knowledge of Arabic culture."

Shavit’s parents emigrated to Mandatory Palestine from Germany. Her mother arrived in 1922 with her family. Her father arrived in 1936 to work on a kibbutz.

References

Israeli women ambassadors
Israeli consuls
Ambassadors of Israel to Argentina
Hebrew University of Jerusalem alumni
1949 births
Living people